One Two Two (or One, Two, Two: 122, rue de Provence) is a French drama film directed by Christian Gion.

Plot
The One-Two-Two, established at 122, rue de Provence, was one of Paris's most luxurious brothels. The film chronicles the eventful daily life of the establishment.

Cast

 Nicole Calfan : Georgette / Fabienne
 Francis Huster : Paul Lardenois
 Jacques François : Bouillaud-Crevel
 Henri Guybet : Marcel Jamet
 Anicée Alvina : Judith
 Catherine Serre : Liza
 Sophie Deschamps : Clarisse
 Nicole Seguin : Doriane
 Michel Peyrelon : Carbone
 Lucien Canezza : Spirito
 René Bouloc : Jo
 Bernard Musson : The President
 Jean-François Dupas : Inspector Bonny
 Denis Héraud : Fouilloux
 Philippe Castelli : The Beret
 Jennifer Bergin : Jennifer
 Lydia Feld : Arletty

Accolades

References

External links

1978 films
1978 drama films
French drama films
Films about prostitution in Paris
1970s French films